17 (seventeen) is the natural number following 16 and preceding 18. It is a prime number.

Seventeen is the sum of the first four prime numbers.

In mathematics 
17 is the seventh prime number, which makes seventeen the fourth super-prime, as seven is itself prime. The next prime is 19, with which it forms a twin prime.  It is a cousin prime with 13 and a sexy prime with 11 and 23. It is an emirp, and more specifically a permutable prime with 71, both of which are also supersingular primes.

Seventeen is the only prime number which is the sum of four consecutive primes: 2,3,5,7. Any other four consecutive primes summed would always produce an even number, thereby divisible by 2 and so not prime. 

.

17 is one of seven lucky numbers of Euler which produce primes of the form .

Seventeen is the sixth Mersenne prime exponent, yielding 131,071.

Since 17 is a Fermat prime, regular heptadecagons can be constructed with a compass and unmarked ruler. This was proven by Carl Friedrich Gauss and ultimately led him to choose mathematics over philology for his studies.

Either 16 or 18 unit squares can be formed into rectangles with perimeter equal to the area; and there are no other natural numbers with this property. The Platonists regarded this as a sign of their peculiar propriety; and Plutarch notes it when writing that the Pythagoreans "utterly abominate" 17, which "bars them off from each other and disjoins them".

Seventeen is the minimum number of vertices on a graph such that, if the edges are coloured with three different colours, there is bound to be a monochromatic triangle; see Ramsey's theorem.

There are also:

17 crystallographic space groups in two dimensions. These are sometimes called wallpaper groups, as they represent the seventeen possible symmetry types that can be used for wallpaper.

17 combinations of regular polygons that completely fill a plane vertex. Eleven of these belong to regular and semiregular tilings, while 6 of these (3.7.42, 3.8.24, 3.9.18, 3.10.15, 4.5.20, and 5.5.10) exclusively surround a point in the plane and fill it only when irregular polygons are included. 

17 distinct fully supported stellations generated by an icosahedron. The seventeenth prime number is 59, which is equal to the total number of stellations of the icosahedron by Miller's rules. Without counting the icosahedron as a zeroth stellation, this total becomes 58, a count equal to the sum of the first seventeen prime numbers.
17 distinct fully supported stellations are also produced by truncated cube and truncated octahedron.

17 four-dimensional parallelotopes that are zonotopes. Another 34, or twice 17, are Minkowski sums of zonotopes with the 24-cell, itself the simplest parallelotope that is not a zonotope. 

17 orthogonal curvilinear coordinate systems (to within a conformal symmetry) in which the three-variable Laplace equation can be solved using the separation of variables technique.

Seventeen is the highest dimension for paracompact Vinberg polytopes with rank  mirror facets, with the lowest belonging to the third.

Seventeen is the minimum possible number of givens for a sudoku puzzle with a unique solution. This was long conjectured, and was proved between 2012 and 2014.

A positive definite quadratic integer matrix represents all primes when it contains at least the set of 17 numbers: {2, 3, 5, 7, 11, 13, 17, 19, 23, 29, 31, 37, 41, 43, 47, 67, 73}. Only four prime numbers up to  73 are not part of the set.

In science
 The atomic number of chlorine.
 The Brodmann area defining the primary visual processing area of mammalian brains.
 Group 17 of the periodic table is called the halogens.
 The number of elementary particles with unique names in the Standard Model of physics.

In languages

Grammar
In Catalan, 17 is the first compound number. The numbers 11 through 16 have their own names.

In French, 17 is the first compound number. The numbers 11 through 16 have their own names.

Age 17
 In most countries across the world, it is the last age at which one is considered a minor under law.
 In the UK, the minimum age for taking driving lessons, and to drive a car or a van 
 In the US and Canada, it is the age at which one may purchase, rent, or reserve M-rated video games without parental consent
 In some US states, and some jurisdictions around the world, 17 is the age of sexual consent 
 In most US states, Canada and in the UK, the age at which one may donate blood (without parental consent)
 In many countries and jurisdictions, the age at which one may obtain a driver's license
 In the US, the age at which one may watch, rent, or purchase R-rated movies without parental consent
The U.S. TV Parental Guidelines system sets 17 as the minimum age one can watch programs with a TV-MA rating without parental guidance.
 In the US, the age at which one can enlist in the armed forces with parental consent 
 In the US, the age at which one can apply for a private pilot licence for powered flight (however, applicants can obtain a student pilot certificate at age 16)
 In Greece and Indonesia, the voting age
 In Chile and Indonesia, the minimum driving age.
 In Tajikistan, North Korea and Timor-Leste, the age of majority

In culture

Music

Bands
 17 Hippies, a German band
 Seventeen, a South Korean boy band
 Heaven 17, an English new wave band
 East 17, an English boy band

Albums
 17 (XXXTentacion album)
 17 (Motel album)
 17 (Ricky Martin album)
 Chicago 17, a 1984 album by Chicago
 Seventeen Days, a 2005 album by 3 Doors Down
 Seventeen Seconds, a 1980 album by The Cure
 17 Carat, a 2015 EP by Seventeen
 Sector 17, a 2022 repackaged album by Seventeen

Songs
 "17 Again", a song by Tide Lines
 "17" (Sky Ferreira song)
 "17" (Yourcodenameis:Milo song)
 "17 Again", a song by Eurythmics
 "17 år", a song by Veronica Maggio
 "17 Crimes", a song by AFI
 "17 Days", a song by Prince
 "17", a song by Dan Bălan
 "17", a song by Jethro Tull
 "17", a song by Kings of Leon
 "17", a song by Milburn
 "17", a song by Rick James from Reflections
 "17", a B-side by Shiina Ringo on the "Tsumi to Batsu" single
 "17", a song by The Smashing Pumpkins from the album Adore
 "17", a song by Youth Lagoon from the album The Year of Hibernation
 "17 Days", a song by Prince & the Revolution, B side from the 1984 "When Doves Cry" single
 "Seventeen" (Jet song)
 "Seventeen" (Ladytron song)
 "Seventeen" (Winger song)
 "Seventeen", a song by ¡Forward, Russia! from Give Me a Wall
 "Seventeen", a song by Jimmy Eat World from Static Prevails
 "Seventeen", a song by Marina & the Diamonds from the US edition of The Family Jewels
 "Seventeen", a song by Mat Kearney from the iTunes edition of Young Love
 "Seventeen", a song from the Repo! The Genetic Opera soundtrack
 "Seventeen", the original title of the song "I Saw Her Standing There" by The Beatles
 "Seventeen", a song by the Sex Pistols from Never Mind the Bollocks, Here's the Sex Pistols
 "Seventeen Forever", a song by Metro Station
 "At Seventeen", a song by Janis Ian
 "Edge of Seventeen", a song by Stevie Nicks
 "Seventeen Ain't So Sweet", a song by The Red Jumpsuit Apparatus from Don't You Fake It
 "Only 17", a song by Rucka Rucka Ali
 "Opus 17 (Don't You Worry 'Bout Me)", a song by Frankie Valli and the Four Seasons
 "(She's) Sexy + 17", a song by Stray Cats from Rant N' Rave with the Stray Cats
 "Hello, Seventeen", a song by 12012
 "Section 17 (Suitcase Calling)", a song by The Polyphonic Spree
 "Day Seventeen: Accident?", a song by Ayreon
 "Seventeen", a song by Alessia Cara
 "Seventeen", a song performed by Marina and the Diamonds
 "Seventeen" and "Seventeen (Reprise)", songs in the musical Heathers
 "Seventeen" and "Seventeen (Reprise)", songs in the musical Tuck Everlasting

Other
 Seventeen, a 1951 American musical
 The ratio 18:17 was a popular approximation for the equal tempered semitone during the Renaissance

Film
 Seventeen (1916), an adaptation of the novel of the same name by Booth Tarkington
 Number 17 (1928), a British-German film
 Number Seventeen (1932), directed by Alfred Hitchcock
 Seventeen (1940), a second adaptation of the Tarkington novel
 Number 17 (1949), a Swedish film
 Stalag 17 (1953), directed by Billy Wilder
 Try Seventeen (2002), directed by Jeffrey Porter
 17 Again (2009), directed by Burr Steers

Anime and manga
 Android 17, a character from the Dragon Ball series
 Detective Konawaka from the Paprika anime has a strong dislike for the number 17

Games
 The computer game Half-Life 2 takes place in and around City 17
 The visual novel Ever 17: The Out of Infinity strongly revolves around the number 17

Print
 The title of Seventeen, a magazine
 The title of Just Seventeen, a former magazine
 The number 17 is a recurring theme in the works of novelist Steven Brust. All of his chaptered novels have either 17 chapters or two books of 17 chapters each. Multiples of 17 frequently appear in his novels set in the fantasy world of Dragaera, where the number is considered holy.
 In The Illuminatus! Trilogy, the symbol for Discordianism includes a pyramid with 17 steps because 17 has "virtually no interesting geometric, arithmetic, or mystical qualities". However, for the Illuminati, 17 is tied with the "23/17 phenomenon".
 In the Harry Potter universe
 17 is the coming of age for wizards. It is equivalent to the usual coming of age at 18.
 17 is the number of Sickles in one Galleon in the British wizards' currency.

Religion
 According to Plutarch's Moralia, the Egyptians have a legend that the end of Osiris' life came on the seventeenth of a month, on which day it is quite evident to the eye that the period of the full moon is over. Now, because of this, the Pythagoreans call this day "the Barrier", and utterly abominate this number. For the number seventeen, coming in between the square sixteen and the oblong rectangle eighteen, which, as it happens, are the only plane figures that have their perimeters equal their areas, bars them off from each other and disjoins them, and breaks up the epogdoon by its division into unequal intervals.
 In the Yasna of Zoroastrianism, seventeen chapters were written by Zoroaster himself. These are the Gathas.
 The number of the raka'ahs that Muslims perform during Salat on a daily basis.
 The number of surat al-Isra in the Qur'an.

In sports

 17 is the number of the longest winning streak in NHL history, which the Pittsburgh Penguins achieved in 1993.
 Larry Ellison's victorious 2013 Americas Cup Oracle racing yacht bears the name "17".
 17 is the number of the record for most NBA championships in NBA History, which the Boston Celtics (and as of 2020, the Los Angeles Lakers) achieved.
 17 is the number of individual laws mentioned in the Laws of the Game (association football).
 17 is the number of games played by each NFL team as of 2021.
 Since the start of the 2014 season, Formula One drivers have been able to choose their own car number; however, following the fatal accident of Jules Bianchi, who drove car #17, the number was retired.

In other fields
Seventeen is:

 Described at MIT as 'the least random number', according to the Jargon File. This is supposedly because in a study where respondents were asked to choose a random number from 1 to 20, 17 was the most common choice.
 This study has been repeated a number of times.
 The number of guns in a 17-gun salute to U.S. Army, Air Force and Marine Corps Generals, and Navy and Coast Guard admirals.
 The number of flames emanating from the grenade cap-badge of the Grenadier Guards.
 During World War II, the four-engined heavy bomber as flown by the USAAF and other Allies and known as "The Flying Fortress", was also known as the B-17
 The maximum number of strokes of a Chinese radical
 The number of syllables in a haiku (5 + 7 + 5)
 In the Nordic countries the seventeenth day of the year is considered the heart and/or the back of winter
 "Highway 17" or "Route 17": See List of highways numbered 17 and List of public transport routes numbered 17
 Seventeen, also known as Lock Seventeen, an unincorporated place in Clay Township, Tuscarawas County, Ohio
 Seventeen was the former name of a yacht prior to being commissioned in the US Navy as the 

 In Italian culture, the number 17 is considered unlucky. When viewed as the Roman numeral, XVII, it is then changed anagrammatically to VIXI, which in the Latin language translates to "I lived", the perfect implying "My life is over." (c.f. "Vixerunt", Cicero's famous announcement of an execution.) Renault sold its "R17" model in Italy as "R177". See Cesana Pariol in the sport section about the name of curve 17.
 The fear of the number 17 is called 'heptadecaphobia' or 'heptakaidekaphobia'
 Some species of cicadas have a life cycle of 17 years (i.e. they are buried in the ground for 17 years between every mating season)
 The number of special significance to Yellow Pig's Day and Hampshire College Summer Studies in Mathematics
 The number to call police in France
 Force 17, a special operations unit of the Palestinian Fatah movement
 The number of the French department Charente-Maritime
 The declared percentage alcohol content (by volume) of Baileys Irish Cream, an Irish whiskey and cream based liqueur made by Gilbeys of Ireland
 The flight number of Malaysia Airlines Flight 17 which was shot down on 17 July 2014 with first test flight of plane is on 17 July 1997 exactly 17 years.
 The record number of concerts performed in a single year at Madison Square Garden by the band Phish in 2017
 The number of deaths and injured people on February 14, 2018, shooting at the Marjory Stoneman Douglas High School shooting.

References

External links

 Properties of 17
 Mathematical properties of 17  at yellowpigs.net
 17
 is 17 the most random number at the wayback machine.
Number 17 at the Database of Number Correlations
Prime Curios for the number 17

Integers